Richard Burton Lawless (born November 1, 1953) is an American former football offensive guard in the National Football League (NFL) for the Dallas Cowboys and Detroit Lions. He played college football at the University of Florida, and earned All-American honors. He was drafted in the second round of the 1975 NFL Draft.

Early years 

Lawless was born in Dothan, Alabama in 1953, before his family moved to Florida. He attended Charlotte High School in Punta Gorda, Florida, where he first drew recognition as an all-state tight end for the Charlotte Fighting Tarpons high school football team.

In 2007, thirty-six years after he graduated from high school, the Florida High School Athletic Association (FHSAA) recognized Lawless as one of the "100 Greatest Players of the First 100 Years" of Florida high school football. In 2001, he was inducted into the Charlotte High School Hall of Fame.

College career 

Lawless accepted an athletic scholarship to attend the University of Florida in Gainesville, Florida, where he played for coach Doug Dickey's Florida Gators football team from 1971 to 1974. As a freshman, he broke his shoulder on his first practice and was moved to offensive tackle when he returned to the team, and eventually to offensive guard, where he arguably became the best pulling guard in Gators history.

He was a three-year starter, a second-team All-Southeastern conference (SEC) selection in 1973 and 1974, and a first-team All-American during his senior season in 1974.  He also played in the 1975 Chicago College All-Star Game.

Lawless returned to the university during the NFL off-season to finish his bachelor's degree in exercise and sport sciences in 1977, and he was inducted into the University of Florida Athletic Hall of Fame as a "Gator Great" in 1978. In one of a series of articles published by The Gainesville Sun in 2006, he was recognized as one of the top 100 Gators (No. 42) of the first 100 years of Florida football.

Professional career 

Lawless was selected by the Dallas Cowboys in the second round (forty-fourth pick overall) of the 1975 NFL Draft, also known as the Dirty Dozen draft. Mitch Hoopes and him were the only rookies to earn starting jobs, with Lawless replacing the traded John Niland at left guard and becoming the first-team rookie to start in the offensive line (including Super Bowl X) since . At the end of the  season, he was named to the NFL All-Rookie team.

In , the improved play of Herbert Scott forced him into a platoon role. In , he was moved to right guard but lost the starting job to Tom Rafferty. Injuries to Scott and John Fitzgerald allowed him to start 6 games (4 at left guard and 2 at right guard).

The next year, he was back to serving as a messenger guard, alternating mainly with Rafferty. After requesting to be traded, he retired in  during training camp and was subsequently traded to the Miami Dolphins for a draft choice (not exercised) on August 19. During his time with the Cowboys, he was a part of three Super Bowl teams, winning Super Bowl XII.

The Miami Dolphins released him on September 1, . On October 23, he signed as a free agent with the Detroit Lions, where he played in nine games. He was released on August 31, . On November 17, he was signed by the Miami Dolphins to be a backup behind Bob Kuechenberg for the last five games of the 1981 season.

In April , Lawless signed a contract with the Chicago Bears. In May, during the off-season, a 12-foot, 5,000-pound plow-arm fell on his head and neck, causing him to be paralyzed from the neck down for 17 days and ending his professional career.

During his seven-season NFL career, Lawless played in eighty-two games, and started in twenty-three of them.

Personal life 

Lawless attended the Cowboys alumni reunion and closing ceremony at Texas Stadium in Dallas on December 20, 2008.

See also 

 1974 College Football All-America Team
 Florida Gators football, 1970–79
 List of Dallas Cowboys players
 List of Detroit Lions players
 List of Florida Gators football All-Americans
 List of Florida Gators in the NFL Draft
 List of University of Florida alumni
 List of University of Florida Athletic Hall of Fame members

References

Bibliography 

 Carlson, Norm, University of Florida Football Vault: The History of the Florida Gators, Whitman Publishing, LLC, Atlanta, Georgia (2007).  .
 Golenbock, Peter, Go Gators!  An Oral History of Florida's Pursuit of Gridiron Glory, Legends Publishing, LLC, St. Petersburg, Florida (2002).  .
 Hairston, Jack, Tales from the Gator Swamp: A Collection of the Greatest Gator Stories Ever Told, Sports Publishing, LLC, Champaign, Illinois (2002).  .
 McCarthy, Kevin M.,  Fightin' Gators: A History of University of Florida Football, Arcadia Publishing, Mount Pleasant, South Carolina (2000). .
 McEwen, Tom, The Gators: A Story of Florida Football, The Strode Publishers, Huntsville, Alabama (1974).  .
 Nash, Noel, ed., The Gainesville Sun Presents The Greatest Moments in Florida Gators Football, Sports Publishing, Inc., Champaign, Illinois (1998).  .

External links 
 This Gator would not go down

1953 births
Living people
People from Punta Gorda, Florida
Players of American football from Florida
All-American college football players
American football offensive linemen
Florida Gators football players
Dallas Cowboys players
Detroit Lions players
Charlotte High School (Punta Gorda, Florida) alumni
Miami Dolphins players